There are a number of Roman Catholic religious orders or congregations with Immaculate Conception in their name.  Several of them are discussed here.

Order of the Immaculate Conception of Our Lady (The Conceptionists) 

Founded in 1484 at Toledo, Spain, by Saint Beatrice of Silva, sister of Blessed Amadeus of Portugal. On the marriage of Princess Isabella of Portugal with King John II of Castile, Beatrice had accompanied the queen to the court of her husband, but her great beauty having aroused the jealousy of the queen, she escaped with difficulty and took refuge in the Dominican convent at Toledo. Here for forty years she led a life of holiness, without becoming a member of the Order. Inspired by an apparition of the Virgin Mary to found a new congregation in her honour, Beatrice of Silva, with some companions, took possession of a convent (the Convent of the Order of the Immaculate Conception) set apart for them by Queen Isabella I of Castile in Toledo.

In 1489, by permission of Pope Innocent VIII, the sisters adopted the Cistercian rule, bound themselves to the daily recitation of the Office of the Immaculate Conception, and were placed under obedience to the ordinary of the archdiocese. In 1501, Pope Alexander VI united this congregation with the Benedictine community of San Pedro de las Duenas, under the Rule of St. Clare, but in 1511 Julius II gave it a rule of its own, and in 1616 special constitutions were drawn up for the congregation by Cardinal Francisco de Quiñones. 

The second convent was founded in 1507 at Torrigo, from which, in turn, were established seven others. The congregation soon spread through Portugal, Spain, Italy, and France. The foundress determined on the habit, which was white, with a white scapular and blue mantle.

The foundress, Beatrice of Silva Menezes (sometimes cited as "Brites") (1424–90), was canonized by Pope Paul VI in 1976; her feast day is 1 September.

Mission Priests of the Immaculate Conception (usually called Missionaries of Rennes) 

Founded at St-Méen in the Diocese of Rennes, by Jean-Marie-Robert de Lamennais, for the care of the diocesan seminary and the holding of missions. The disciples of the founder's younger brother, Félicité de Lamennais, in 1829 withdrew with him into the solitude of La Chênaie, forming the Society of St. Peter, with which the elder community at its own request was united, under the superiorship of Félicité. 

The new congregation was placed under simple vows, the aims proposed being the defence of the Faith, the education of youth, and the giving of missions. A house of studies was erected at Malestroit, near Ploërmel, and placed under the direction of Fathers Blanc and Rohrbacher, while Lamennais remained at La Chênaie, with the younger members, writing for them his "Guide de la jeunesse", and for others more advanced the "Journée du chrétien". Lamennais's project of forming a body of priests thoroughly equipped for pressing needs in the Church of France, a scheme which he outlined in 1825 in a letter to M. de Salinis, seemed well on the way towards fulfilment. A vivid picture of the rule of life and the spirit of La Chênaie is to be found in the letters of Maurice de Guerin, whose companions were such men as Olympe-Philippe Gerbet, Prosper Guéranger, Jean-Joseph Gaume, Bruno Dominique de Scorbiac, and Charles Sainte-Foi. 

The condemnation of L'Avenir disturbed only temporarily the activity of La Chénaie. On the final defection of Félicité, however, the Bishop of Rennes transferred to Jean-Marie the superiorship of the congregation, the members of which left La Chênaie for Malestroit, laymen being now excluded. The congregation, reorganized, gained a new lease of life in 1837 and by 1861 had 200 members in nine houses, under the mother-house at Rennes.

Servites of the Immaculate Conception 

The priests of the Immaculate Conception got charge of three congregations at Constantinople, one at Feri-kuei, for Georgians and Armenians, another for the Latins at Scutari, and a third for Georgian Greek Catholics at Pera.

Candidates for the priesthood were ordained in Saratov by the Bishop of Tiraspol, who was the ecclesiastical superior of the Catholic Church in Georgia; for a time they filled parish duties as secular priests, after which they were appointed by the congregation to a post where they might minister to their countrymen.

The Sister Servites of the Immaculate Conception conduct two primary schools, to which children are admitted, without distinction of creed.

According to Father Christopher Zugger, nine Servite missionaries from Constantinople, headed by Exarch Shio Batmanishvili, came to the Democratic Republic of Georgia to permanently establish the Byzantine Rite in Old Georgian there, and by 1929 their faithful had grown to 8,000. Tragically, their mission came to an end with the arrests of Exarch Shio and his priests by the Soviet secret police in 1928, their imprisonment in the Gulag at Solovki prison camp, and their subsequent murder by Joseph Stalin's NKVD at Sandarmokh in 1937.

Sisters of Providence of the Immaculate Conception 

Founded at Jodoigne, in 1833, definitively established at Champion near Namur (also in Belgium) in 1836, by Canon Jean-Baptiste-Victor Kinet, for the instruction of children, the care of orphan asylums and the service of the sick and prisoners. 

In 1858 the congregation received the approbation of the Apostolic See, and shortly afterwards the confirmation of its statutes. By 1876 there were 150 convents in Belgium, England, Italy and the United States. The mother-house is at Champion.

Sisters of the Immaculate Conception (France)

A branch of the Association of the Holy Family of Bordeaux, founded in France in 1820 by Pierre-Bienvenu Noailles, a canon of that city, who conceived the idea of founding a congregation in which Christians of every class of life might lead a life of perfection. In 1820 he placed the first three members of the Holy Family in a house at Bordeaux, under the name of the Ladies of Loreto. As the numbers increased the sisters were divided by their founder into two categories: 
(1) Those engaged directly in the various works undertaken by the Institute; 
(2) Lay sisters who perform household duties, and are called the Sisters of St. Martha. These are sub-divided into three branches: 
(a) The Sisters of St. Joseph who undertake the charge of orphans; 
(b) The Sisters of the Immaculate Conception, who devote themselves to educational work; 
(c) The Sisters of Hope, who nurse the sick. The Institute encountered much opposition at first, but the constitutions have now been canonically approved by the Holy See. The works of the Sisters of the Immaculate Conception are numerous; they devote themselves to educational work and visiting the poor. 

In the early 20th century they had 15 convents in Great Britain and Ireland, to all of which and to five boarding-schools elementary schools are attached. About 230 sisters taught in these convents, the English novitiate being at Rock Ferry, Cheshire, the other English houses: at Great Prescot Street, London, E.; Leeds; Sicklinghall, Yorkshire; Stockport; Macclesfield; Stalybridge; Woodford, Essex; Ramsgate; Liscard, Cheshire; Birkenhead; also in Wrexham, Wales;  and in Leith, Scotland. Attached to the Leeds convent is a juniorate for testing vocations. 

The habit in England only is blue with a white girdle and a black veil. In Ireland they have one house in the Archdiocese of Armagh at Magherafelt, and another in Kildare, to both of which schools are attached. The institute has novitiate houses at Bordeaux, France; Bas-Oha, Liège, Belgium; Hortaleza, Madrid, Spain; Bellair, Natal, South Africa; Montreal, Canada; and two in Asia. Besides the novitiates there are juniorates attached to some of the convents. There is one at Lozère, Mende, France, and one at Liège, Belgium, and one at Fromista, Spain.

Sisters of the Immaculate Conception (Louisiana) 

Twenty years after Pope Pius IX's Apostolic Constitution, Ineffabilis Deus, the Archdiocese of New Orleans's second indigenous religious congregation of women was founded, as the Sisters of the Immaculate Conception.  They were founded in Labadieville, Louisiana, by the French-born Reverend Cyprien Venissat and Miss Adelaide Elvina Vienne.  A former school-teacher, she took the veil (as Mother Mary of the Immaculate Conception, CIC) from the Most Reverend Napoléon-Joseph Perché, on 11 July 1874. Mother Mary died in 1885, at the age of 48.

Their habit consisted of a black tunic and a blue scapular in honor of the Virgin Mary.

The Community was a teaching order among the young in the State of Louisiana.  Following the Second Vatican Council, however, the order's ranks dwindled (as with so many other communities) and by 3 January 2022, there was only one living member, Sister Jerome.

In the 2007 film, The Church on Dauphine Street (by Ann Hedreen and Rustin Thompson), their former mother-house, the Immaculate Conception Convent, is featured.  Built in 1932, it is now the St Gerard Majella Center and Archdiocesan Deaf Ministry.  The film traces its restoration following the catastrophic Hurricane Katrina.

Missionary Sisters of the Immaculate Conception of Mary (originally from Spain)

The order "Missionary Sisters of the Immaculate Conception of Mary" (RCM, Concepcionistas Misioneras de la Enseñanza) was founded in 1892 in Burgos, Spain by sister St. Carmen Sallés y Barangueras along with three other sisters.  The sisters opened schools in several parts of Spain.  Later sites in Brazil and in other countries in the world were established.  The Sisters of the Immaculate Conception founded by Carmen Sallés work in the following countries: Spain, Brazil, Venezuela, Japan, United States (California), Dominican Republic, Equatorial Guinea, Democratic Republic of Congo, Italy, Philippines, Korea, Mexico, India, Republic of Congo, Indonesia and Haiti.

See also
 Sisters of the Immaculate Conception of the Blessed Virgin Mary, founded in Lithuania, convent in Connecticut
 Armenian Sisters of the Immaculate Conception
 Confraternity of the Immaculate Conception, the Servers' Guild of the Manila Cathedral

References

Bibliography
Bibliography to the Louisiana Order
 The Catholic Church in Louisiana, by Roger Baudier, New Orleans, 1939.
 Guide to the Catholic Sisterhoods in the United States, edited by Thomas P. McCarthy, CSV, The Catholic University of America Press, 1964.  
 Spicing Ecclesiastical Gumbo: The Life of Napoléon-Joseph Perché, by William Lemuel Greene, Claitor's Publishing Division, 2012.  
 Blessed Francis Seelos Xavier Seelos Church: Celebrating 150 Years of the Former St Vincent de Paul Church, by the Very Reverend José I. Lavastida Mata, Blessed Francis Xavier Seelos Parish, 2015.

External links
 RCM Delegation of North America Site
Sisters of the Immaculate Conception
 Concepcionistas Misioneras de la Enseñanza

Catholic orders and societies
1484 establishments in Europe

es:Orden de la Inmaculada Concepción